Deborah Del Prete is an American producer. Her son, actor and musician Terence Jay has appeared in/composed a number of films that she has produced. She is the cofounder of OddLot Entertainment along with Gigi Pritzker.

Producer filmography

See also 
Terence Jay

References

American film producers
Living people
Year of birth missing (living people)
Place of birth missing (living people)
American independent film production company founders